Pavel Kantorek (born 8 February 1930) is a retired long-distance runner from Czechoslovakia. He was born in Prague. He represented Czechoslovakia in three consecutive Summer Olympics in the men's marathon, starting in 1956. Kantorek is a three-time winner of the Košice Peace Marathon.

Marathon races

External links

1930 births
Living people
Athletes from Prague
Czechoslovak male long-distance runners
Czech male long-distance runners
Czech male marathon runners
Czechoslovak male marathon runners
Olympic athletes of Czechoslovakia
Athletes (track and field) at the 1956 Summer Olympics
Athletes (track and field) at the 1960 Summer Olympics
Athletes (track and field) at the 1964 Summer Olympics